The wattled jacana (Jacana jacana) is a wader which is a resident breeder from western Panama and Trinidad south through most of South America east of the Andes.

Breeding
The wattled jacana lays four black-marked brown eggs in a floating nest. The male, as with other jacanas and some other wader families like the phalaropes, takes responsibility for incubation, with two eggs held between each wing and the breast. The females are polyandrous and will help to defend the nests of up to four mates.

Description
These are conspicuous and unmistakable birds. The adults have a chestnut back and wing coverts, with the rest of the body mainly black. In flight the greenish yellow flight feathers are obvious. Also visible are yellow bony spurs on the leading edge of the wings, which it can use to defend itself and its young. The yellow bill extends up as a red coot-like head shield and a reddish wattle, and the legs and very long toes are dull blue-grey.

Young birds initially have entirely white underparts, and can always be identified by the presence of white in their plumage.

Taxonomy
There are six subspecies, with the nominate J. j. jacana being the most widespread. Several of the other subspecies are similar, but J. j. hypomelaena of western Panama and northern Colombia has all the chestnut plumage replaced by black, and J. j. scapularis of western Ecuador has some black feathers on its chestnut shoulders, and white outer primary feathers.

Subspecies
J. j. hypomelaena (Gray, 1846): west-central Panama to northern Colombia
J. j. melanopygia (Sclater, 1857): western Colombia to western Venezuela
J. j. intermedia (Sclater, 1857): north & central Venezuela
J. j. jacana (Linnaeus, 1766): Trinidad, southern Colombia & southern Venezuela through the Guianas south to eastern Bolivia, northern Argentina & Uruguay
J. j. scapularis (Chapman, 1922): western Ecuador & northwestern Peru
J. j. peruviana (Zimmer, 1930): northeastern Peru & northwestern Brazil
This species produces a range of noisy rattling calls.

Diet
The wattled jacana's food is insects (such as beetles, grasshoppers and crickets), other invertebrates (e.g. ticks and mollusks), small fish, roots and seeds picked from the floating vegetation or the water's surface.

References

External links

 
 
 
 
 
 

Jacana (genus)
Birds of South America
Birds of Panama
Birds of Trinidad and Tobago
Birds of the Caribbean
Birds described in 1766
Taxa named by Carl Linnaeus